The Little Plain Historic District is a predominantly residential historic district located in Norwich, Connecticut. When originally listed in 1970, it was centered on Little Plain Park, located about halfway between modern downtown Norwich and the Norwichtown green, the colonial center of the town. From the late 18th century onward this area became a desirable and fashionable area to live, as it was closer to the growing port area of the city. The area was mostly built out by about 1875, and features a rich concentration of Greek Revival, Gothic Revival and Italianate houses, although older and later styles are also represented. The district was listed on the National Register of Historic Places in 1970 and enlarged in 1987.

Little Plain Park is a long and narrow triangular parcel bounded on the east by Broadway, the wet by Union Street, and the south by Crossway Street.  It was donated to the city by Deacon Jabez Huntingdon and Hezekiah Perkins, whose houses stand at 181 and 185 Broadway.  Both are prominent examples of Georgian architecture to which Federal styling was later applied. The Dewitt-Sigourney House, at 189 Broadway, was built later in the 19th century for a ship's captain, and is a more pure example of Federal styling.  The Woodhull and Johnson Houses at 167 and 171 Broadway are fine examples of Greek Revival architecture, built for merchants and ship owners.

The district includes buildings designed by Norwich architects James A. Hiscox and Joshua W. Shepard.

See also
Neighborhoods of Norwich, Connecticut
National Register of Historic Places listings in New London County, Connecticut

References

Federal architecture in Connecticut
Historic districts in New London County, Connecticut
Norwich, Connecticut
National Register of Historic Places in New London County, Connecticut
Historic districts on the National Register of Historic Places in Connecticut